The following is a list of awards and nominations received by English actress Kate Winslet. She is the youngest person to acquire six Academy Award nominations, with seven nominations in total, and the tenth-youngest Best Actress nominee for her role of Rose Dewitt Bukater in Titanic, receiving the nomination at the age of 22. She won the Academy Award in this category for The Reader (2008). Among her numerous accolades for her performances, Winslet has won an Oscar, two Emmys, a Grammy, three Critics' Choice's, two AACTAs, three BAFTAs, five Golden Globes, four Screen Actors Guild Awards and a Producers Guild Award. She is one of the few actresses to have won three of the four major American entertainment awards (EGOT), with her Academy Award, Primetime Emmy Award, and Grammy Award wins.

Winslet is the only actress to receive two Academy Award nominations as the younger versions of the characters played by fellow nominees Gloria Stuart, as Rose DeWitt Bukater, in Titanic, and Judi Dench, as Iris Murdoch, in Iris. She is only the second actress, after Sigourney Weaver, to win a Golden Globe for Best Actress (Drama) (for Revolutionary Road) and a Golden Globe for Best Supporting Actress (for The Reader) in the same year.

In 2007, British Academy of Film and Television Arts (BAFTA) honoured her with Britannia Award. She received the 2009 Santa Barbara International Film Festival Modern Master (Montecito) Award in recognition of her accomplishments in the film industry. In 2011, Winslet received the Yo Dona award for Best Humanitarian Work for her work with the Golden Hat Foundation, whose mission is to eliminate barriers for autistic people. Winslet was appointed as Commander of the Order of the British Empire (CBE) for the 2012 Birthday Honours for services to drama. The same year, she was honoured with an Honorary César Award. In 2014, the American Library Association awarded her an Odyssey Award for her audiobook performance of Roald Dahl's children's novel Matilda. In 2015, Film Society of Lincoln Center honoured her at the 53rd New York Film Festival for her contributions to arts, and BAFTA with a special career tribute titled BAFTA A Life in Pictures. In 2017, she was honoured with an Actors Inspiration Award by SAG-AFTRA for both her entertainment and philanthropic work.

She received a star on the Hollywood Walk of Fame, inducted at 6262 Hollywood Blvd., which was unveiled on 17 March 2014 at Saint Patrick's Day by Winslet, with Kathy Bates and Shailene Woodley as guest speakers at the unveiling ceremony.

Major associations

Academy Awards

BAFTA Awards

Golden Globe Awards

Primetime Emmy Awards

Screen Actors Guild Awards

Grammy Awards

Other awards

AACTA Awards

Empire Awards

European Film Awards

Satellite Awards

Critic associations

Other Industry Awards

Festival Awards

Audience Awards

Other recognitions

Manchester Evening News Theatre Awards

Earphones Awards

Odyssey Awards

See also
 List of British actors
 List of British Academy Award nominees and winners
 List of oldest and youngest Academy Award winners and nominees – Youngest nominees for Best Actress in a Leading Role
 List of actors with Academy Award nominations
 List of actors with two or more Academy Award nominations in acting categories
 List of Academy Award records
 List of Golden Globe winners
 List of EGOT winners – People who have won Emmy, Grammy, Oscar and Tony Awards
 List of Kate Winslet performances

Notes

References

External links
 

Winslet, Kate